Asnæs is a town in Odsherred Municipality in northwestern Zealand in Denmark. It is situated approximately 90 kilometres west of Copenhagen and has a population of 3,100 (1. January 2022). 

The town is home to a swimming hall, a sports hall, Asnæs Skole folkeskole, Asnæs Centret shopping center, Odsherred Gymnasium, and a large production site for NKT Cables.

Notable people 
 Christian Poulsen (born 1980 in Asnæs) a Danish former footballer, winning 454 club caps; regular member of the Denmark national football team with 92 caps

Transport 
Asnæs is situated close to the Danish route 21 and has a railway station on the Odsherred Railway Line, terminating in Holbæk and connecting to trains to Copenhagen.

References

Cities and towns in Region Zealand
Odsherred Municipality